Vinegar Strokes (born August 21, 1984) is the stage name of Daniel Jacob, a drag queen from London.

Early life 
Before performing in drag, Jacob studied at the Liverpool Institute for Performing Arts in order to become an actor. However, he did not get any acting jobs until adopting the Vinegar Strokes persona.

Career 
She is known for her appearance on the first series of RuPaul's Drag Race UK, as well as performing with Drag Race judge Michelle Visage and US Drag Race winner Bianca Del Rio in the West End Musical Everybody's Talking About Jamie.

After Drag Race, Strokes plays Lady Von Fistenberg in the "camp drag murder mystery" play Death Drop.

She has also her music singles to YouTube, as well as an online cooking series.

Filmography

Television

Web series

References

External links

 Vinegar Strokes on the IMDb

1984 births
Living people
20th-century English LGBT people
21st-century English LGBT people
English drag queens
Gay entertainers
LGBT Black British people
People from London
Vinegar Strokes